Petrol is a 2022 Australian drama film directed by Alena Lodkina, starring Nathalie Morris and Hannah Lynch.

Cast
 Nathalie Morris as Eva
 Hannah Lynch as Mia

Release
The film premiered at the Locarno Film Festival on 5 August 2022.

Reception
Erwan Debois of the International Cinephile Society rated the film 3.5 stars out of 5, writing that "Lodkina does not seek nor need any pretext to go deep into the jungle with her characters, which proves to be the perfect setting – along with the kind of magical hotel / cabaret concealed in it – to bring her heartfelt and singular coming-of-age tale to an open-ended conclusion." 

Phil Hoad of The Guardian rated the film 3 stars out of 5, calling it "an experience that’s difficult to categorise and often tough to enjoy, but captivating in subtle ways." Stephen A. Russell of Time Out rated the film 3 stars out of 5, writing that "in its best moments, Petrol reminds us that Lodkina is clearly a talented filmmaker to watch, with big ideas and plenty more left in the tank."

References

External links
 
 

Australian drama films
2022 drama films
2022 films